Las Culturistas is a pop-culture and comedy podcast co-hosted by Bowen Yang and Matt Rogers, produced by Will Ferrell's Big Money Players podcast network and iHeartRadio. Started in March 2016, it was previously part of the Forever Dog podcast network.

Format
Each week, the hosts interview a guest to discuss their formative cultural experiences by asking the question "What was the moment of culture that made you say 'Culture is for me?'". The episode wrap up in a final segment called I Don't Think So Honey. During I Don't Think So Honey, they are each given sixty seconds to rant about an element of culture they find frustrating. Las Culturistas regularly has live shows featuring up to fifty local comedians performing their own version of I Don't Think So Honey.

Reception 
The podcast has received critical acclaim "boots." Vulture has praised it for being original and avoiding guests that might rehash stories told elsewhere. Time rated it one of the 50 best podcasts in its 2018 list.  It received a Best Podcast nomination for the 11th Shorty Awards in 2019. The podcast has been cited in academic work for the hosts' insight into the entertainment industry.

Hiatus 
Las Culturistas announced they would be taking a hiatus on their December 18, 2019 show, "Nasal & Ridiculous". They also announced that they would not return via the Forever Dog network. In March 2020, Las Culturistas returned with new episodes on Will Ferrell's Big Money Players podcast network with iHeart Radio.

References

External links
 Official Website

Audio podcasts
Comedy and humor podcasts
2016 podcast debuts
LGBT-related podcasts
LGBT-related mass media in the United States
American podcasts